Zelo Surrigone is a comune (municipality) in the Metropolitan City of Milan in the Italian region Lombardy, located about  southwest of Milan.

The church of Santa Giuliana (1418) has frescoes from the 15th and 16th centuries.

References

External links
 Official website

Cities and towns in Lombardy